The women's tournament in ice hockey at the 2014 Winter Olympics was held in Sochi, Russia.

For the first time, the women's gold medal game was decided in overtime, with Canada defeating the United States 3–2. Switzerland defeated Sweden for their first Olympic ice hockey medal in 66 years, and first medal in the women's tournament.

With the win, the Canadian women's national ice hockey team won its fourth consecutive gold medal, a feat only previously accomplished by the Soviet Union men's team in 1964–76, and the Canadian men's team in 1920–32. Canadians Hayley Wickenheiser, Jayna Hefford and Caroline Ouellette became the first hockey players to win four Olympic gold medals. They also joined Soviet biathlete Alexander Tikhonov and German speed skater Claudia Pechstein as the only athletes to win gold medals in four straight Winter Olympics.

On 6 December 2017, nearly four years after the tournament was played, six players from the Russian national team (Inna Dyubanok, Yekaterina Lebedeva, Yekaterina Pashkevich, Anna Shibanova, Yekaterina Smolentseva, and Galina Skiba) were subjected to sanctions, and the team was disqualified by the International Olympic Committee (IOC) based on findings from the reanalysis of doping samples collected from Russian athletes at the 2014 Winter Games by the Oswald Commission. Ten days later, Tatiana Burina and Anna Shukina were also sanctioned and the International Ice Hockey Federation (IIHF) was directed to modify results accordingly. All eight of the players were "declared ineligible to be accredited in any capacity for all editions of the Games of the Olympiad and the Olympic Winter Games subsequent to the Olympic Winter Games Sochi 2014" and "disqualified from the events in which they participated" by the IOC. The players registered their appeals with the Court of Arbitration for Sport (CAS) and, in 2018, five of the eight players (Lebedeva, Pashkevich, Smolentseva, Burina, and Shukina) won their appeals, the sanctions against them were annulled and their results were reinstated. The sanctions against Inna Dyubanok, Anna Shibanova, and Galina Skiba were partially upheld, though the life-ban on Olympic competition was lifted, and the disqualification of the team was maintained on account of their violations.

Qualification

Russia qualified as the host. Canada, the United States, Finland, Switzerland, and Sweden qualified as the top five teams in the IIHF World Ranking. Germany and Japan qualified via the qualification tournament.

Rosters

Officials
The IIHF selected six referees and nine linesmen to work the 2014 Winter Olympics. They were the following:

Referees
  Erin Blair
  Melanie Bordeleau
  Jay Cheverton
  Anna Eskola
  Nicole Hertrich
  Aina Hove
  Jack Long
  Joy Tottman

Linesmen
  Therese Bjorkman
  Denise Caughey
  Stephanie Gagnon
  Charlotte Girard
  Alicia Hanrahan
  Laura Johnson
  Michaela Kúdeľová
  Ilona Novotná
  Zuzana Svobodová

Preliminary round

Format
The top four teams based on the 2012 IIHF World Ranking, Canada, United States, Finland and Switzerland, competed in Group A, while the remaining four teams competed in Group B. The top two teams in Group A received a bye to the semifinals. In the quarterfinals, the third place team in Group A played the second place team in Group B, while the fourth placed team in Group A played the first place team in Group B. The winners advanced to the semifinals, while the two losers, and the third and fourth placed teams in Group B, competed in a classification bracket for places five through eight. This format has been used since the 2012 World Championship.

Tiebreak criteria
In each group, teams were ranked according to the following criteria:
Number of points (three points for a regulation-time win, two points for an overtime or shootout win, one point for an overtime or shootout defeat, no points for a regulation-time defeat);
In case two teams are tied on points, the result of their head-to-head match will determine the ranking;
In case three or four teams are tied on points, the following criteria will apply (if, after applying a criterion, only two teams remain tied, the result of their head-to-head match will determine their ranking):
Points obtained in head-to-head matches between the teams concerned;
Goal differential in head-to-head matches between the teams concerned;
Number of goals scored in head-to-head matches between the teams concerned;
If three teams remain tied, result of head-to-head matches between each of the teams concerned and the remaining team in the group (points, goal difference, goals scored);
Place in 2012 IIHF World Ranking.

All times are local (UTC+4).

Group A

Group B

Final round

Bracket

 † Indicates overtime victory
 ‡ Indicates shootout victory

Quarterfinals
The top two teams (A1–A2) received byes and were deemed the home team in the semifinals as they were seeded to advance.

Semifinals
Teams seeded A1 and A2 were the home teams.

Bronze medal game

Gold medal game

5–8th place bracket

5–8th place semifinals

Seventh place game

Fifth place game

Final rankings
The final rankings of the 2014 Winter Olympics Women's Ice Hockey Tournament are as follows:

The Russian team was disqualified for the doping. The IIHF was requested by the IOC to modify their results, and the 6th and 7th place were reallocated.

Statistics

Scoring leaders
List shows the top skaters sorted by points, then goals.

GP = Games played; G = Goals; A = Assists; Pts = Points; +/− = Plus/minus; PIM = Penalties in minutes; POS = PositionSource: IIHF.com

Leading goaltenders
Only the top five goaltenders, based on save percentage, who have played at least 40% of their team's minutes, are included in this list.
TOI = Time on ice (minutes:seconds); SA = Shots against; GA = Goals against; GAA = Goals against average; Sv% = Save percentage; SO = ShutoutsSource: IIHF.com

Tournament awards
Media All-Stars
Goaltender: 
Defence: , 
Most Valuable Player: 
Individual Awards as selected by the Tournament Directorate
Best Goaltender: 
Best Defenceman: 
Best Forward:

References

External links

Official IIHF website

 
2014
Olympics
2014 in Russian women's sport
Women's ice hockey in Russia
Women's events at the 2014 Winter Olympics